Ludmila Matiegková (9 March 1889–26 August 1960) was a Czechoslovak teacher, archaeologist and egyptologist.

She graduated in Oriental studies from Charles University, where she later worked. She was the first female member of the Oriental Institute, ASCR.

Publications
1912. Nová bádání o kamenné době egyptské. Kojetín, Časopis Pravěk.
1918. Jak vzniklo písmo Praha, Vilímek.
1925. O staroegyptských bozích a hrdinech. Praze, Ústřední nakladatelství a knihkupectví učitelstva českoslovanského.
1927. V objetí sfingy.
1930. Příběhy bílého oslíka
1934. Záhada. Praha.
1937. Dítě v starém Egyptě Praha, Anthropologický ústav Karlovy university.

References

1889 births
1960 deaths
Women classical scholars
Czechoslovak archaeologists
Czechoslovak Egyptologists
Charles University alumni
People from Lovosice